Robert Bartels (28 April 1911 – 20 August 1943) was a German U-boat commander in World War II.

Naval career
Robert Bartels joined the Reichsmarine in 1935. He went through U-boat familiarisation in July 1940 in preparation for his own command. On 24 July 1940 Bartels commissioned the new Type IID . He left the boat on 20 December 1940. From there he went to the 1st U-boat Flotilla and another U-boat familiarisation, this time in order to prepare for his command of the larger Type VIIC boat,  on 13 March 1941. With this vessel Bartels went out on his first war patrol on 25 May 1941, a 69-day patrol where he sank one small ship. When he left the boat on 5 September 1942 after eight patrols he had sunk or destroyed five ships for over 21,000 tons and damaged another - the last three ships fell to mines laid by U-561. Bartels went through his third U-boat familiarisation in September and October 1942 in order to prepare for the much larger Type IXD2 boats. These vessels were very long range and were later converted for transport use. Bartels commissioned the new  on 10 October 1942.

Death
The day before its loss, U-197 had met with Wolfgang Lüth's  where Bartels told Lüth he intended to stay in this area and hunt the traffic Lüth had told him about. Their radio chatter had allowed the Allies to pinpoint the location, finding Bartels' boat the next day. On 20 August 1943 U-197 was attacked south of Madagascar, in position , by a British PBY Catalina aircraft, C of No. 259 Squadron RAF, with six depth charges and slightly damaged. As the aircraft had no more bombs, it attempted to strafe with her machine guns, but the U-boat responded with AA fire. The aircraft then circled the U-boat at a safe distance and radioed for assistance. The U-boat remained on the surface, perhaps assuming that any support was unlikely, and that the aircraft would eventually have to abandon her vigil. Unfortunately for the German submarine, another Catalina, FP 313 of 265 Squadron, arrived. U-197 promptly crash-dived, and the aircraft dropped three depth charges, two of which detonated to port of the U-boat, but the third hit her squarely, killing all 67 hands. The pilot, captain Ernest Robin, received the Distinguished Flying Cross for the sinking of the vessel.

Bartels of U-197 had radioed a distress signal. The correct response by any boat in the vicinity, according to orders, would have been to assist at top speed. The BdU twice ordered U-196 to aid U-197 before Kentrat responded, and by that time U-197 and the entire crew were lost.

Ships attacked

See also
List of people who disappeared mysteriously at sea

Awards
German Cross in Gold on 28 August 1942 as Kapitänleutnant on U-561 in the 29th U-boat Flotilla

References

Citations

Bibliography

 
 

1911 births
1940s missing person cases
1943 deaths
Kriegsmarine personnel killed in World War II
Missing person cases in Germany
Military personnel from Kiel
People from the Province of Schleswig-Holstein
People lost at sea
Recipients of the Bronze Medal of Military Valor
Recipients of the Gold German Cross
Reichsmarine personnel
U-boat commanders (Kriegsmarine)
Deaths by airstrike during World War II
Missing in action of World War II